Yale New Haven Health System (YNHHS) is a nonprofit healthcare system with headquarters in New Haven, Connecticut. It is Connecticut's largest healthcare system with 2,409 beds and  includes hospitals, physicians and related health services throughout Connecticut as well as New York and Rhode Island. Institutions affiliated with the system include Bridgeport Hospital, Greenwich Hospital, Lawrence + Memorial Hospital, Westerly Hospital, Smilow Cancer Hospital, Yale New Haven Hospital, Yale New Haven Children's Hospital, Yale New Haven Psychiatric Hospital and Northeast Medical Group.

History 
Yale New Haven Health System was formed in 1996 through a partnership between Bridgeport and Yale New Haven hospitals. The system expanded in 1998 with the addition of Greenwich Hospital. In 2016, an affiliation between Yale New Haven Health and Lawrence + Memorial Healthcare, which includes Lawrence + Memorial Hospital and Westerly Hospital in Rhode Island, was approved. The system is affiliated with Yale University in support of patient care, medical education and clinical research. It also has clinical and business relationships with several hospitals in Connecticut and numerous outpatient locations throughout the state. The system operates more than 360 locations in Connecticut, southeastern New York and Rhode Island. As of September 30, 2020, YNHHS managed 2,681 beds and more than 28,589 employees.

In August 2018, YNHHS was awarded the AHIMA Grace Award. The award "recognizes achievements in health information management that measurably impact quality and performance, highlighting organizations that leverage data analytics to make better decisions around clinical, financial, and operational challenges."

Leadership 
 Christopher O’Connor: CEO, YNHHS
 Keith Churchwell: President, Yale New Haven Hospital

Community 
In fiscal year 2016, YNHHS provided $178.1 million in community benefits, including uncompensated, undercompensated and charity care.

References

1996 establishments in Connecticut
Hospital networks in the United States
Organizations based in New Haven, Connecticut
Organizations established in 1996
Medical and health organizations based in Connecticut